The broad-snouted caiman (Caiman latirostris) is a crocodilian in the family Alligatoridae found in eastern and central South America, including southeastern Brazil, northern Argentina, Uruguay, Paraguay, and Bolivia. It is found mostly in freshwater marshes, swamps, and mangroves, usually in still or very slow-moving waters. It will often use man-made cow ponds.

Characteristics

Most tend to be of a light olive-green color. A few individuals have spots on their faces. The most notable physical characteristic is the broad snout from which its name is derived. Borteiro et al 2009 studied the food habits of C. latirostris. The snout is well adapted to rip through the dense vegetation of the marshes. Due to this, they swallow some of the dense vegetation while foraging for food.<ref name="Borteiro2009">Borteiro, C. Gutierrez, F. Tedros, M. and Kolenc, F. Food habits of the Broad-snouted Caiman (Caiman Latirostris:Crocodylia, Alligatoridae) in northwestern Uruguay. Studies on Neotropical Fauna and Environment. Vol. 44, No. 1, April 2009, 31-36.</ref>

Biology and behavior

The broad-snouted caiman is ectothermic, it depends on its external environment to regulate its body temperature. A recent study on the heart rate's contribution to the regulation of the caimans' body temperature showed an increase in heart rate as the temperature increased, and it lowers once the temperature lowered. Borteiro et al 2008 study young caimans' behaviour and find they rely heavily on their ability to find shelter to avoid predation. They find this behaviour quickly drops off as they age. The heat of the sun is absorbed through the skin into the blood, keeping its body temperature up. An increased heart rate helps the newly absorbed heat transfer throughout the body more quickly. When the air becomes cooler, the need for the heart rate to remain at an increased rate is lost.

Hunting and diet
Its diet consists mainly of small invertebrates, and it can crush shells to feed on turtles and snails (including ampullarid snails). As the size of C. latirostris increases, the size of its prey tends to increase. All young broad-snouted caimans have a diet consisting of mostly insects; however, as the caiman grows, it increases its intake of birds, fish, amphibians, and reptiles. Captive specimens have been documented and photographed devouring the fruit of Philodendron bipinnatifidum without external stimulation, though it is unclear if this is because of them being housed with tegu or a natural behaviour. A later study by another group also concluded that C. latirostris'' and its relatives are obligate omnivores, and play an important role in the dispersal of plant seeds in their habitats.

Reproduction
The female lays 18 to 50 eggs at a time. While rare, up to 129 eggs have been found within a single nest, presumably from several layings. They lay their eggs in two layers, with a slight temperature difference between the two layers. This will result in a more even ratio of males and females. The caiman does not have sex chromosomes, but instead depends on temperature to determine the ratio of male and female offspring. Eggs at warmer temperatures ( or higher) develop into males and eggs at cooler temperatures ( or lower) develop into females. There are more important factors that contribute to the sex determination of the eggs. Estrogen levels and stress levels of the mother can have an effect. There was a study conducted that concluded that every nest was different in sex although they contained the same temperature. This indicated there are other factor that contribute to a nest having all male or females eggs.

Conservation
Hunting of the species began in the 1940s. Its skin is greatly valued for its smooth texture. Until most countries have made hunting them illegal, this was the largest threat to the broad-snouted caiman.  This helped them to regain their population. The new threat is habitat destruction. Deforestation and pollution run-off are the two leading causes to the destruction of their habitat.

It is a very well-known species in the lagoons of the urban areas of Barra da Tijuca and Recreio dos Bandeirantes, in Rio de Janeiro.1990 – Endangered (E)
1988 – Endangered (E)
1986 – Endangered (E)
1982 – Endangered (E)

Notes

References

Alligatoridae
Crocodilians of South America
Extant Miocene first appearances
Reptiles of Argentina
Reptiles of Bolivia
Reptiles of Brazil
Reptiles of Paraguay
Reptiles of Uruguay
Fauna of the Pantanal
Mangrove fauna
Reptiles described in 1801
Taxa named by François Marie Daudin